Daybell is a surname. Notable people with the surname include:

Kim Daybell (born 1992), British tennis player
Chad Daybell (born 1968), American man from Idaho charged with the murder of his stepchildren and wife
Lori Daybell (born 1973), American woman from Idaho charged in the killing of her children